The Vehicle Birth (VB) was a rock band that performed and recorded between January 1993 and May 1999.

Biography
They released one full-length record on Crank! Records and achieved some success gaining radio play, reaching 24 on the CMJ charts and charting in The Gavin Report in the summer of 1998.  They toured extensively throughout the United States. Travis Morrison from  The Dismemberment Plan recorded and produced most of their early output, and the two bands frequently played shows together.

The VB played rock music with a wide dynamic range.  The band experimented with the different fads of the time and kept the bits they found relevant from free-form improvisation; math rock (frequent time signature changes and odd meters); lo-fi; slowcore; and emo/spazcore/screamo as it developed on the East Coast through bands such as Rites of Spring and Fugazi, and in the Northwest with more mainstream acts such as Sunny Day Real Estate; and heavy use of tape delay.  Some songs were fairly straightforward, but a common theme was creating tension through music and then providing a release.

The VB began performing at the Dharma Coffeehouse and The Music Store in Fairfax City, Virginia. At that time the band was performing with bands like The Dismemberment Plan (the band would record several times with Travis from The Dismemberment Plan). In 1994, they moved to Boston, Massachusetts, continued to tour, and released several 7” records. A 1996 session in Rhode Island was self-released as an LP called Tragedy in early 1997. In 1998, Crank! Records re-released it, providing greater distribution.  Touring proved to be stressful for the band, and they chose to end their existence in 1999, playing their last show in Portland, Oregon

The Vehicle Birth reunited for two Virginia shows, one in Arlington @ Galaxy Hut on 03/19/11 and the other in Fairfax @ The Dharma Coffeehouse.

Touring Partners
Since describing music often fails, a useful frame of reference might be some of the more recognizable bands with which the band shared a stage.  The band played shows with contemporaries such as Young Astronauts Club, The Dismemberment Plan (DC), Sweep the Leg Johnny (IL), The Elevator Drops, The Regrets (KS), Green Magnet School, Dambuilders, Kramer (Shimmydisc, NY), Smearcase (NC), Victory at Sea, Quintaine Americana, Jejune (CA), The Transmegetti (NJ), Tristeza (CA), Karate (band), Six Going on Seven, Jetpack (RI), Robots, Dagobah, The Wicked Farleys, The Jose Fist, Thee Hydrogen Terrors (RI), Slant Six (DC), Pitchblende (DC), Eggs (DC), Tsunami (DC), Jawbox (DC), Burning Airlines (DC), At the Drive-In (TX), Piebald, Faraquet (DC), A Minor Forest, Smart Went Crazy (DC), Les Savy Fav (RI/NY), Archers of Loaf (NC), The Control Group/The Doosies, The For Carnation (KY), Gang of Four (Leeds, UK), Sunday's Best (CA), and many others.

Discography
Tragedy (1997, self-release; 1998, Crank! reissue)
 Allmusic ([ link])
 Baby Sue (link)
Recorded by Keith Souza, Sampson, Rhode Island in June 1996
Crackfarm
We Need to Find the Girls
Marathon
Sideshow
Lifehighschool
The Leaders of Pursuit
Yankeedom
Daycap
One Mississippi
23
The Discovery of Oxygen
"Limousine" b/w "Zero Work", "Amsterdam" 7" (Lit)
split single w/The Wicked Farleys (1999, Doom Nibbler) (song: "Toronto")
various artists : They Came from Massachusetts (Big Wheel Recreation) (song: "Coltrane")

References

External links
 
 Label bio
 Certainly, Sir site
 Statehood site
  The Movies (Timothy James' current band) Website

Rock music groups from Virginia
Musical groups established in 1993
Musical groups disestablished in 1999